{{DISPLAYTITLE:Zc(3900)}}

The Zc(3900) is a hadron, a type of subatomic particle made of quarks, believed to be the first tetraquark that has been observed experimentally. The discovery was made in 2013 by two independent research groups: one using the BES III detector at the Chinese Beijing Electron Positron Collider, the other being part of the Belle experiment group at the Japanese KEK particle physics laboratory.

The Zc(3900) is a decay product of the previously observed anomalous Y(4260) particle.

The Zc(3900) in turn decays into a charged pion (π±) and a J/ψ meson. This is consistent with the Zc(3900) containing four or more quarks.

The first evidence of the neutral Zc(3900) was provided by CLEO-c in 2013. It was later observed by BESIII in 2015. It decays into a neutral pion (π0) and a J/ψ meson.

Researchers were expected to run decay experiments in 2013 to determine the particle's nature with more precision.

See also
 XYZ particle
 X(3872)
 Y(4140)
 Z(4430)

References

External links
BES III experiment
Belle experiment

Mesons